Bruton High School is a high school located north of Williamsburg in the unincorporated community of Lightfoot in York County, Virginia.

The school opened in 1976. It is part of the York County School Division, serving upper county citizens in Williamsburg. Athletic teams compete in the Virginia High School League's AA Bay Rivers District in Region I. Bruton houses the York County School of the Arts, the county's fine arts magnet program.

Accreditation
Bruton High is fully accredited by the Virginia Department of Education and has been accredited by the Southern Association of Colleges and Schools since 1976.

Feeder patterns
The following elementary schools feed into Bruton H.S.:
 Magruder Elementary School
 Waller Mill Elementary School

All students zoned to Queens Lake Middle School are zoned to Bruton High School.

Athletics
Bruton High fields teams in these sports:
Cheerleading (Head Coach: Charity Choice)
Cross-Country (Head Coach: Chris Boop)
Field Hockey (Head Coach: Jessica Bradley)
Football (State Runner up 2009)(Head Coach: Barrington Morrison)
Golf (Head Coach: James Barr)
Volleyball (Head Coach: Alexis Calloway)
Boys Basketball (Head Coach: Tony Carr)(2000 AA State Championship)
Girls Basketball (Head Coach: TBD)
Indoor Track and Field ( Head Coaches, Kendall Green, Sharnice Atkinson)
Swimming (Head Coach: Richard Long)
Wrestling  (Head Coach:  Kyle Cowles)
Baseball (Head Coach: Feenie Carter)
Boys Soccer (Head Coach: Luke Taylor)
Boys Tennis  (Head Coach:  James Barr)
Boys Outdoor Track and Field (Head Coach: Kendall Green)
Girls Soccer (Head Coach: Will Spear)
Girls Tennis (Head Coach: John Jacobson)
Girls Outdoor Track and Field (Head Coach: Sharnice Atkinson)(1997 & 1998 AA State Championship)
Girls Softball (Head Coach: Kyle Cowles)

Notable alumni
Zena Cardman, 2017 NASA astronaut
Onrea Jones, former professional football player, Arizona Cardinals
Mark Montgomery, former professional baseball player, Scranton/Wilkes-Barre RailRiders
Bryan Randall, former professional football player, American Arena League
Lorenzo Taliaferro, professional football player 
Jack Tatum, musician and founder of Wild Nothing
 Elizabeth Winder, author
 Paul Winfree, chair of the Fulbright Foreign Scholarship Board and former Deputy Assistant to the President for Domestic Policy, Deputy Director of the White House Domestic Policy Council, and Director of Budget Policy

References

External links
 Bruton High School Official Web Page

Schools in York County, Virginia
Public high schools in Virginia
Educational institutions established in 1976
Magnet schools in Virginia
1976 establishments in Virginia